Clyde Mountain, at an elevation of  , is a mountain in the Southern Tablelands region of New South Wales, Australia.

Location and features
Clyde Mountain is located in the Great Dividing Range within the Monga National Park.

The road leading up towards the summit of Clyde Mountain is a  section of steep, winding section of the Kings Highway in New South Wales, Australia. It is the location of many crashes, 22% of all incidents on the Kings Highway occurring on a  stretch on and near the mountain. There are three safety ramps (runaway truck ramps) for trucks or heavy vehicles which lose control of their speed or suffer brake failure. Slow vehicle turnouts have been added on the Clyde Mountain descent, which allows vehicles to pass trucks in low gear.

References

4. http://www.ozatwar.com/ozatwar/demolition.htm

Mountains of New South Wales
Southern Tablelands